The women's triple jump event  at the 2002 European Athletics Indoor Championships was held on March 1–2.

Medalists

Results

Qualification
Qualifying perf. 14.00 (Q) or 8 best performers (q) advanced to the Final.

Final

References
Results

Triple jump at the European Athletics Indoor Championships
Triple
2002 in women's athletics